KZRN is a radio station serving the Hettinger, North Dakota area. It broadcast's on FM frequency 102.3 MHz and is under ownership of Jeff Hallen, through licensee Hirange Media Corp Inc.

The license to cover was granted on February 18, 2011. The transmitter site is northwest of Hettinger, on 2nd Avenue NW.

History background
The original plans were for the station to have a frequency of 93.5. The unbuilt construction permit was held by Alma Corporation, who sold the station to MidNation Media for $25,000, outbidding Randy Michaels’ Radioactive LLC by $2,000 in the 2006 FCC auction. Subsequently, the Federal Communications Commission (FCC) said that it was selling the construction permit to MidNation for $60,000. From that point on, the deal was closed.

Effective September 4, 2018, MidNation Media LLC sold KZRN to Hirange Media Corp Inc for $65,000.

References

External links

ZRN
Radio stations established in 2011
2011 establishments in North Dakota